The 2005 FIVB Volleyball Men's World Grand Champions Cup was held in Nagano and Tokyo, Japan from 22 to 27 November 2005.

Qualification

Competition formula
The competition formula of the 2005 Men's World Grand Champions Cup was the single Round-Robin system. Each team plays once against each of the 5 remaining teams. Points were accumulated during the whole tournament, and the final standing was determined by the total points gained.

Squads

Venues
 Nagano White Ring, Nagano, Japan
 Tokyo Metropolitan Gymnasium, Tokyo, Japan

Results
All times are Japan Standard Time (UTC+09:00).

|}

Nagano round

|}

Tokyo round

|}

Final standing

Team Roster
Marcelinho, André Heller, Giba, Murilo, André, Sérgio, Anderson, Samuel, Gustavo, Rodrigão, Ezinho, Ricardo
Head Coach: Bernardinho

Awards
MVP:  André Nascimento
Best Scorer:  André Nascimento
Best Spiker:  Alessandro Fei
Best Blocker:  Ryan Millar
Best Server:  Abdalsalam Abdallah
Best Setter:  Ricardo Garcia
Best Libero:  Mirko Corsano

External links
Official website

FIVB Volleyball Men's World Grand Champions Cup
World Grand Champions Cup
FIVB Men's World Grand Champions cup
V

ja:2005年ワールドグランドチャンピオンズカップ#男子競技